1996 Academy Awards may refer to:

 68th Academy Awards, the Academy Awards ceremony that took place in 1996
 69th Academy Awards, the 1997 ceremony honoring the best in film for 1996